Maxim Vladimirovich Spiridonov (born April 7, 1978) is a Russia professional ice hockey forward.

Career
Spiridonov began his career with CSKA Moscow playing in their 2nd team. He moved onto play junior hockey for the Smiths Falls Bears in the Canadian Junior Hockey League and the London Knights of the Ontario Hockey League before he was drafted by the Edmonton Oilers, 241st overall, in 1998. Spiridonov spent the next three seasons playing in the minor leagues, suiting up for the Grand Rapids Griffins, Springfield Falcons, Tallahassee Tiger Sharks and the Hamilton Bulldogs. He never managed to play in the NHL however and in 2001, Spiridonov returned to Russia.

Spiridonov now works as a scout for the OHL's Kitchener Rangers.

Career statistics

References

External links

1978 births
Living people
Ak Bars Kazan players
Amur Khabarovsk players
Barys Nur-Sultan players
EHC Basel players
Edmonton Oilers draft picks
Hamilton Bulldogs (AHL) players
HC Dinamo Minsk players
HC Dynamo Moscow players
Grand Rapids Griffins (IHL) players
Lokomotiv Yaroslavl players
London Knights players
Metallurg Magnitogorsk players
Metallurg Novokuznetsk players
Russian ice hockey right wingers
Salavat Yulaev Ufa players
Severstal Cherepovets players
Springfield Falcons players
Ice hockey people from Moscow
Tallahassee Tiger Sharks players
Torpedo Nizhny Novgorod players